Petracola ventrimaculatus, the spotted lightbulb lizard, is a species of lizard in the family Gymnophthalmidae. It is endemic to Peru.

References

Petracola
Reptiles of Peru
Endemic fauna of Peru
Reptiles described in 1900
Taxa named by George Albert Boulenger